First Person Singular may refer to:

Literature
 First Person Singular (short story collection), a 2020 short story collection by Haruki Murakami
 First Person Singular (play), a play by Lewis Grant Wallace
 "First Person Singular", a short story by Eric Frank Russell published in Deep Space (1954)

Film and television
 First Person Singular: Pearson – The Memoirs of a Prime Minister, a 1973–1975 Canadian television miniseries
 First Person Singular, the original title of The Mercury Theatre on the Air radio series
 First Person Singular, a 1969–1975 BBC Scotland interview series presented by Mary Marquis
 First Person Singular: I. M. Pei, a 1997 PBS documentary about I. M. Pei

See also
 First person singular, referring to the grammatical person